Kalle Dalin (born March 8, 1975) is a Swedish orienteering competitor and European champion. He received a gold medal in long distance at the 2004 European Orienteering Championships, and also a bronze medal in the relay event.

References

External links
 

1975 births
Living people
Swedish orienteers
Male orienteers
Foot orienteers
21st-century Swedish people